Xerophagy ("dry eating", from Greek  "dry" and  "eat") is 
a form of fasting observed in Eastern Christianity during Great Lent and certain other fasts.
"Dry" primarily refers to food cooked without oil. 
In the Greek tradition, "oil" generally refers to olive oil, but in Slavic tradition, this also extends to butter and to other types of vegetable oil. 
The diet during xerophagy consists of bread, fruit, nuts (sometimes also honey), as well as vegetables cooked with water and salt. 

Outside of the regular calendar of Christian fasts, xerophagy may also be used as a penance for specific transgressions.  For example, in the 35 Canons of Saint John the Faster, the penance for any monk caught in homosexual acts includes a xerophagic diet for three years along with other penances.

See also
Raw foodism

References

Asceticism
Christian fasting
Eastern Christian liturgy